Mindat Township is a township located in Mindat District in the Chin State of Myanmar. The township is located between latitude 21.19 and 21.47, longitude 93.23 and 94.29. Mindat was a part of Pakokku Hill Tracts District.

The "K'cho" or "Cho" people are the main ethnic group in the township. The K'cho people speak the K'cho language, distinct from surrounding Chin dialects. K'cho ethnic groups in the township are the Mün, the M'Kang and the Dai.

Buddhism and Christianity is the main religions in Mindat. Many residents practice Buddhism due to its proximity to the Yaw region, where it is the main religion.

Mindat is divided into five blocks; AShaePyin (East plain), Bawathit (new life), SanPya (model), ANaut (west side) and Kyekhe. SanPya occupies central area of town and most shops and businesses are located there.

Communities
Mindat is the major and only town; it is located in the southeastern part of the township. The township has 46 village tracts and 497 villages.

History
By 1947 Construction of the union of Burma, Pakokku province was established with two districts in 1948. They are Pakokku District and Kanpetlet District (Pakokku Hill Tacts) with 11 townships. Townships are Pakokku, Mindat, Yesagyo, Pauk, Seikphyu, Myaing, Gangaw, Htilin, Saw, Kanpetlet and Matupi. Capital city is Pakokku. In 1958, the name of Kanpetlet District was changed into Mindat District and Kanpetlet District's capital was moved to Mindat from Kanpetlet.

On 2 March 1962, the military led by General Ne Win took control of Burma through a coup d'état, and the government has been under direct or indirect control by the military. A new constitution of the Socialist Republic of the Union of Burma was adopted in 1974.

By 1974 construction, Pakokku province was abolished and Pakokku District was added to the Magway Division and Mindat District was added to the Chin State until now.

Religion 

There are various religions in the town. Missionaries walk or motorbike to outlying villages to convert people.

Catholic 
There is a Catholic church, which maintains a nursery school and living quarters for the elderly.

Buddhism 
There are three Buddhist monasteries; one in the Western Quarter, another in Sanpya Quarter and the last one in Eastern Quarter.

Notes

External links
 "Mindat Google Satellite Map" Maplandia World Gazetteer

Townships of Chin State